Conospermum galeatum is a shrub endemic to Western Australia.

It blooms between August and September producing white flowers.

It is found in a small area in the Wheatbelt region of Western Australia where it grows in sandy soils.

References

External links

Eudicots of Western Australia
galeatum
Endemic flora of Western Australia
Plants described in 1995